Eslamabad (also Romanized as Eslāmābād; also known as Shahabad (Persian: شاه اباد), also Romanized as Shāhābād) is a village in Pishkuh-e Zalaqi Rural District, Besharat District, Aligudarz County, Lorestan Province, Iran. At the 2006 census, its population was 68, in 14 families.

References 

Towns and villages in Aligudarz County